Viktor Hugo Johnson (29 February 1908 – 6 June 1983) was a Swedish sailor. He was a crew member of the Swedish boat Slaghöken that won a silver medal in the Dragon class at the 1948 Summer Olympics.

References

1908 births
1983 deaths
Swedish male sailors (sport)
Olympic sailors of Sweden
Sailors at the 1948 Summer Olympics – Dragon
Olympic silver medalists for Sweden
Olympic medalists in sailing
Royal Gothenburg Yacht Club sailors
Medalists at the 1948 Summer Olympics
Sportspeople from Gothenburg